Norway Tamil Film Festival Awards is the annual film festival conducted in Oslo to honour both artistic and technical excellence of professionals in the Tamil film industry. NTFF was arranged for the first time in 2010 by VN Music Dreams. NTFF is a celebration of global Tamil cinema.

Film awards

Best Film
The Best Film has been awarded since 2010.

The Most Popular Film
The Most Popular Film was first awarded in 2010, before being re-launched in 2013.

The Most Appreciated Film 
The Most Appreciated Film  was first awarded in 2010, before being re-launched in 2013.

Midnight Sun Award 
The Midnight Sun Award has been awarded since 2010.

Best Social Awareness Award 
The Best Social Awareness Award has been awarded since 2012.

NTFF 2017- List of Awardees - Tamil Short Film - International

Acting Awards

Best Actor
The Best Actor has been awarded since 2011.

Best Actress
The Best Actress has been awarded since 2011.

Best Comedian
The K.S.Balachandran Award/Best Comedian has been awarded since 2011.

Best Villain
The Best Villain has been awarded since 2012.

Best Supporting Actor
The Best Supporting Actor has been awarded since 2011.

Best Supporting Actress
The Best Supporting Actress has been awarded since 2011.

Best Character Actor
The Best Character Actor has been awarded since 2015.

Best Newcomer Actor
The Best Newcomer Actor has been awarded since 2013.

Best Newcomer Actress
The Best Newcomer Actress has been awarded since 2013.

Best Newcomer
The Best Newcomer was awarded in 2011 and 2012, before separate categories were introduced for Actor and Actress.

Technical Awards

Best Director
The Best Director has been awarded since 2011.

Best Producer
The Best Producer has been awarded since 2011.

Best Cinematographer
The Best Cinematographer has been awarded since 2011.

Best Editor
The Best Editor has been awarded since 2011.

Best Screenplay
The Best Screenplay has been awarded since 2011.

Best Story Writer
The Best Story Writer has been awarded since 2012.

Best Choreographer
The Best Choreographer has been awarded since 2011.

Best Stunt Choreographer
The Best Stunt Choreographer has been awarded since 2011.

Best Art Director
The Best Art Director has been awarded since 2012.

Best Costume Designer
The Best Costume Designer has been awarded since 2012.

Best Make-Up Artiste
The Best Make-Up Artiste has been awarded since 2011.

Best Visual Effects
The Best Visual Effects has been awarded since 2011.

Best Dubbing Artiste
The Best Dubbing Artiste has been awarded since 2012.

Music Awards

Best Music Director
The Best Music Director has been awarded since 2011.

Best Male Playback Singer
The Best Male Playback Singer has been awarded since 2012.

Best Female Playback Singer
The Best Female Playback Singer has been awarded since 2012.

Best Lyricist
The Best Lyricist has been awarded since 2011.

Special awards

Special Jury Award
The Special Jury Award has been awarded since 2012.

Kalaichchigaram Award
The Kalaichchigaram Award has been awarded since 2011.

Balu Mahendra Award
The Balu Mahendra Award has been awarded since 2015.

K. S. Balachandran Award
The K.S.Balachandran Award/Best Comedian has been awarded since 2011.

Lifetime achievement award
The Special Jury Award has been awarded since 2012.

References

Norwegian film awards
Tamil film awards